Francis Watson (born 1956) is an English theologian and New Testament scholar. He commenced his career at King's College London before being appointed to the Kirby Laing Chair of New Testament Exegesis at the University of Aberdeen in 1999. In 2007 he took up his current position as Professor in the Department of Theology and Religion at the Durham University.

Watson is well known as a critic of the so-called New Perspective on Paul (NPP). His criticisms of the NPP are all the more significant as he received a positive endorsement of James D.G. Dunn (a NPP proponent) for his doctoral study. After the latter endorsement, Watson explored in particular the social-scientific work of Klaus Berger which contributed to Watson changing his mind dramatically about some results of his unpublished thesis. The result was Paul, Judaism, and the Gentiles: A Sociological Approach, which chronicles Watson's change of mind.

Watson's 2013 volume, Gospel Writing. A Canonical Approach, is his most voluminous study to date. Extensive critical review articles include those by Markus Bockmuehl and Richard Bauckham.

Ted Dorman suggests that for Watson, "hermeneutical sovereignty resides not in the text but in the subject matter to which it points" – namely, Jesus Christ.

Watson is the editor of New Testament Studies.

Works

Thesis

Books
 - published form of his thesis

as Editor

Articles and Chapters

References

1956 births
Living people
English theologians
British biblical scholars
New Testament scholars
Academic journal editors
Academics of King's College London
Academics of the University of Aberdeen
Academics of Durham University